Luteibacter yeojuensis is a bacterium from the genus of Luteibacter which has been isolated from greenhouse soil from Yeoju in Korea.

References

Xanthomonadales
Bacteria described in 2006